Charles Martel (c. 688–741) was a Frankish military and political leader.

Charles Martel may also refer to:

People
Charles Martel of Anjou (1271–1295), titular King of Hungary
Charles Martel (librarian) (1860–1945), American librarian
Charles Martel, Duke of Calabria (1327)
Karl Hermann Martell (1906–1966), German actor

Other
 French battleship Charles Martel
 Charles Martel-class ironclad
 Charles Martel Group, a French far-right, anti-Arab terrorist organization which operated in the 1970s and 1980s
 Charles Martel Society, publisher of The Occidental Quarterly

Martel, Charles